This is a list of earthquakes in 1932. Only magnitude 6.0 or greater earthquakes appear on the list. Lower magnitude events are included if they have caused death, injury or damage. Events which occurred in remote areas will be excluded from the list as they wouldn't have generated significant media interest. All dates are listed according to UTC time. Overall a much quieter year than 1931 in terms of magnitude 7.0+ events. There was however still a couple of large earthquakes which shook parts of Dutch East Indies, China, Greece and especially Mexico. The worst event in terms of death toll happened in Iran which has experienced deadly events also in 1930 and 1931.

Overall

By death toll 

 Note: At least 10 casualties

By magnitude 

 Note: At least 7.0 magnitude

Notable events

January

February

March

April

May

June

July

August

September

October

November

December

References

1932
 
1932